The Philadelphia Open Championship is an annual golf tournament played in the Philadelphia, Pennsylvania area. It is organized by the Golf Association of Philadelphia. It has been played annually since 1903 (except for war years & 2020) at member clubs in Pennsylvania, New Jersey, and Delaware. It was considered a PGA Tour event for most of the period 1916 to 1937.

Winners

2020 No tournament
2019 Jeff Osberg (amateur)
2018 Billy Stewart
2017 Matthew Mattare (amateur)
2016 Jeff Osberg (amateur)
2015 Brandon Matthews (amateur)
2014 Matt Teesdale (amateur)
2013 Brandon Matthews (amateur)
2012 Andrew Mason
2011 Andrew Mason
2010 Michael R. Brown
2009 Rich Steinmetz
2008 Greg Pieczynski
2007 Mark Miller
2006 Dave Quinn
2005 Graham Dendler
2004 Chris Lange
2003 Brian Kelly
2002 John Appleget
2001 Terry Hertzog
2000 Brian Kelly
1999 Rick Osberg
1998 Jason Lamp
1997 Michael Brown
1996 Jim Booros
1995 Gene Feiger
1994 Stu Ingraham
1993 Gene Feiger
1992 Frank Dobbs
1991 Frank Dobbs
1990 Pete Oakley
1989 Pete Oakley
1988 James Masserio
1987 Jay Sigel
1986 Jay Sigel
1985 James Masserio
1984 Frank Dobbs
1983 Ed Dougherty
1982 Harold Perry
1981 Dick Hendrickson
1980 Jay Sigel
1979 Jack Connelly
1978 Jay Sigel
1977 Jay Sigel
1976 Tim DeBaufre
1975 Jay Sigel
1974 Joseph F. Data
1973 Dick Hendrickson
1972 Dick Hendrickson
1971 Ted McKenzie
1970 Dick Smith
1969 Bill Hyndman
1968 Bill Hyndman
1967 John Kennedy
1966 Al Besselink
1965 Jerry Pisano
1964 Pat Schwab
1963 Al Besselink
1962 Jerry Pisano
1961 Dick Sleichter
1960 Skee Riegel
1959 George Fazio
1958 George Fazio
1957 Jerry Pisano
1956 George Fazio
1955 Henry Williams, Jr.
1954 Ralph Hutchison
1953 George Griffin, Jr.
1952 George Fazio
1951 Henry Williams, Jr.
1950 Bud Lewis
1949 George Fazio
1948 Jim McHale Jr.
1947 Gene Kunes
1946 Matt Kowal
1945 No tournament
1944 Joe Zarhardt
1943 No tournament
1942 Bud Lewis
1941 Terl Johnson
1940 Ed Dudley
1939 Sammy Byrd
1938 Ted Turner
1937 Leonard Dodson
1936 Ed Dudley
1935 Ted Turner
1934 Herman Barron
1933 Ed Dudley
1932 George E. Griffin, Sr.
1931 Clarence Hackney
1930 Clarence Hackney
1929 Ed Dudley
1928 Tommy Armour
1927 Johnny Farrell
1926 Emmet French
1925 Johnny Farrell
1924 Joe Kirkwood, Sr.
1923 Clarence Hackney
1922 Charles Hoffner
1921 Willie Macfarlane
1920 Frank T. MacNamara
1919 Emmet French
1918 Pat Doyle and Arthur Reid (tie) 
1917 Jim Barnes
1916 James Fraser
1915 Tom McNamara
1914 Tom McNamara
1913 John McDermott
1912 Gilbert Nicholls
1911 John McDermott
1910 John McDermott
1909 Gilbert Nicholls
1908 Jack Campbell
1907 James Campbell
1906 Donald Ball
1905 James Campbell
1904 Jack Campbell
1903 Jack Campbell

External links
Golf Association of Philadelphia
List of Philadelphia Open Winners

References

Former PGA Tour events
Golf in Pennsylvania
Golf in Delaware
Golf in New Jersey
Sports in Philadelphia
Recurring sporting events established in 1903
Annual events in Pennsylvania
1903 establishments in Pennsylvania